Mardyan is a village and the center of Mardyan District, Jowzjan Province, Afghanistan.

See also
 Jowzjan Province

Populated places in Jowzjan Province